Josef Jindra (born June 12, 1980) is a Czech professional ice hockey defenceman. He played with BK Mladá Boleslav in the Czech Extraliga during the 2010–11 Czech Extraliga season.

Career statistics

References

External links

1980 births
Living people
BK Mladá Boleslav players
Czech ice hockey defencemen
HC Tábor players
HKM Zvolen players
IHC Písek players
KLH Vajgar Jindřichův Hradec players
LHK Jestřábi Prostějov players
Motor České Budějovice players
MsHK Žilina players
VHK Vsetín players
Sportspeople from České Budějovice
Czech expatriate ice hockey players in Slovakia